The Pulkovo Astronomical Observatory, officially named the Central Astronomical Observatory of the Russian Academy of Sciences at Pulkovo, is the principal astronomical observatory of the Russian Academy of Sciences. It is part of the UNESCO World Heritage Site Historic Centre of Saint Petersburg and Related Groups of Monuments. It was formerly known as the Imperial Observatory at Pulkowo.

Early years 

The observatory was opened in 1839.
Originally, it was a brainchild of the German/Russian astronomer Friedrich Georg Wilhelm von Struve, who would become its first director (in 1861, his son Otto Wilhelm von Struve succeeded him). The architect was Alexander Bryullov. The observatory was equipped with state-of-the-art devices, one of them being the a  aperture refractor, one of the largest refractors in the world at that time (see Great Refractor). In 1885, the observatory was equipped with  refractor, which was the biggest usable refractor in the world, until the  telescope at the Lick Observatory in California a few years later. Both were built by Alvan Clark & Sons in Massachusetts.
The principal line of work of the observatory consisted of determination of coordinates of stars and astronomical constants, such as precession, nutation, aberration and refraction, and also discovering and measuring double stars. The observatory's activities have also been connected to the geographical study of the territory of Russia and development of navigation. The star catalogues, containing the most precise positions of 374, and then 558 stars, were made for the years 1845, 1865, 1885, 1905 and 1930.

By the 50th anniversary of the Observatory, they had built an astrophysical laboratory with a mechanical workshop and installed the Europe's largest refractor, (30 inch). Astrophysical research really gained momentum with the appointment of Feodor Bredikhin as a director of the Observatory in 1890 and transfer of Aristarkh Belopolsky from the Moscow Observatory, an expert in stellar spectroscopy and solar research. In 1923, they installed a big Littrow spectrograph, and in 1940 – a horizontal solar telescope, manufactured at a Leningrad factory. After having received an astrograph in 1894, the observatory began its work on astrophotography. In 1927, the Observatory received a zone astrograph and with its help the Russian astronomers catalogued the stars of the near-polar areas of the sky. Regular observation of movements of celestial poles began with the construction of the zenith telescope in 1904. In 1920, the Observatory started transmitting the exact time by radio signals. The observatory participated in the basic geodesic work, namely in measuring degrees of the arc of the meridian from the Danube to the Arctic Ocean (until 1851), and in triangulation of Spitsbergen in 1899–1901. Military geodesists and hydrographers used to work at the Observatory as interns. The Pulkovo Meridian, which passes through the center of the main building of the Observatory and is located at 30°19,6‘ east of Greenwich, was the point of departure for all former geographical maps of Russia.

In order to observe the southern stars that could not be seen on the observatory's latitude, the scientists organized two affiliated observing locations. One of them was an astrophysical station in the Crimean town of Simeiz (Simeiz Observatory), which had been organized on the basis of a private observatory presented to the Pulkovo Observatory by an astronomy lover N. S. Maltsev in 1908. The other was an astrometric station in Mykolaiv – a former observatory of the Department of the Navy, (today's Nikolaev Astronomical Observatory).

Later history 

During the siege of Leningrad (1941–1944), the Observatory became the target of fierce German air raids and artillery bombardment. All of the buildings were completely destroyed. Under dramatic circumstances, the main instruments were saved and stored safely in Leningrad, including the lens of the destroyed 30-inch refractor, and a significant part of the unique library with manuscripts and important works from the 15th to 19th century. On February 5, 1997, nearly 1,500 of the 3,852 books were destroyed by malicious arson and the rest of the library items were damaged by flames, smoke or water.

Even before the end of the war, the Soviet government made a decision to restore the Observatory. In 1946, it began the construction after having cleared the territory. In May 1954, the Observatory was re-opened, not only having been restored but considerably expanded in terms of instruments, employees and research subjects. New departments had been created, such as the Department of Radio Astronomy and Department of Instrument Making (with its own optical and mechanical workshop). The surviving old instruments were repaired, modernized and put into service once again. Also installed were new instruments, such as the  refractor, a horizontal meridian device, a photographic polar telescope, a big zenith telescope, stellar interferometer, two solar telescopes, coronagraph, a big radio telescope and a variety of labware.
The 65 cm Zeiss refractor was originally intended as a gift from then Chancellor of Germany Adolf Hitler to the Italian Benito Mussolini, but it was not delivered and instead was recovered by the Soviet Union.

The Simeiz station became a part of the new Crimean Astrophysical Observatory of the Soviet Academy of Sciences in 1945. They also built the Kislovodsk Mountain Astronomical Station and a laboratory in Blagoveshchensk. The observatory organized many expeditions for determining differences of longitudes, observing passages of Venus and solar eclipses, and studying astroclimate. In 1962, the Observatory sent an expedition to Chile to observe stars in the southern skies.

Gallery

Directors

See also 
 List of Russian astronomers and astrophysicists

References

External links 

 History of the observatory (in Russian)
 The official site of Pulkovo observatory
 Overview of the observatory
 

1839 establishments in the Russian Empire
Astronomical observatories built in the Soviet Union
Astronomical observatories in Russia
Buildings and structures completed in 1839
Institutes of the Russian Academy of Sciences
Science museums in Saint Petersburg
World Heritage Sites in Russia
Cultural heritage monuments of federal significance in Saint Petersburg